Podhradní Lhota is a municipality and village in Kroměříž District in the Zlín Region of the Czech Republic. It has about 500 inhabitants.

Sights
Ruins of the castle Nový Šaumburk is located in the municipality.

References

Villages in Kroměříž District